Protechnik was a front company established on 24 June 1987 by the South African Defence Force to perform quality assurance testing of chemical protective materials and equipment within a covert operation known as Project Coast. 

Founded by Dr. Jan Lourens, a bio-engineering consultant at Roodeplaat Research Laboratories,  as Systems Research and Development (SRD), with funding provided by the Medical arm of the SADF. Protechnik's shareholders would include Medchem Consolidated Investments (MCI), WPW Investments (a firm belonging to Wouter Basson) the Luxembourg-based Charburn Enterprises. According to testimony provided in the Wouter Basson trial, Protechnik was involved in reverse engineering Chemical Agent Monitors.

The company is now a subsidiary of Armscor.

Other SADF front organisations
 Badger Arms
 Biocon (South Africa)
 Civil Cooperation Bureau
 Delta G Scientific Company
 Electronic Magnetic Logistical Component
 Executive Outcomes
 Geo International Trading
 Infladel
 Jeugkrag
 Lema (company)
 Military Technical Services
 Roodeplaat Research Laboratories
 Veterans for Victory

References

Defence companies of South Africa
Chemical companies of South Africa
Chemical warfare
South African companies established in 1987